This is a list of radio stations that broadcast on FM frequency 87.8 MHz:

Australia
 1A12 in Canberra, Australian Capital Territory
 Radio Austral in Sydney, New South Wales
 Vision Radio Network in Griffith, New South Wales
 Vision Radio Network in Mudgee, New South Wales
 Vision Radio Network in Young, New South Wales
 Vision Radio Network in Moree, New South Wales
 Vision Radio Network in Gold Coast, Queensland
 Vision Radio Network in Mackay, Queensland
 Vision Radio Network in Port Lincoln, South Australia
 Vision Radio Network in Port Pirie, South Australia
 Kiss FM Australia in Geelong, Victoria
 Wodonga TAFE Radio in Wodonga, Victoria
 Newy 87.8 FM in Newcastle, New South Wales

China 
 CNR  Business Radio in Haikou
 CNR Hong Kong Radio
 TJTRS Tianjin Binhai Radio

France
 France Inter at Paris

Malaysia
 8FM in Kedah, Perlis, Penang & Taiping, Perak
 Sinar in Johor Bahru, Johor & Singapore

New Zealand
Various low-power stations up to 1 watt

United States

In the United States, a number of low-power radio stations operate on analog television channel 6; this channel broadcasts its audio on the 87.75 MHz frequency. While most of these stations market themselves on "87.7," (due to the .2 MHz odd-decimal spacing used in the United States) such stations are equally audible on 87.8 MHz.

References

Lists of radio stations by frequency